HMS R1 was one of 10 R-class submarine built for the Royal Navy during the First World War. The boat was not completed before the end of the war and was sold for scrap in 1923.

Design and description
The R-class submarine was designed to meet an Admiralty requirement for a specialised hunter-killer submarine with an emphasis on submerged performance. They displaced  on the surface and  submerged. The R-class submarines had a crew of 2 officers and 20 ratings.

For surface running, the boats were powered by a single eight-cylinder   diesel engine that drove the single propeller shaft. When submerged it was driven by a  electric motor. They could reach  on the surface and  underwater.

The boats were armed with six 18-inch (45 cm) torpedo tubes in the bow. They carried six reload torpedoes for a grand total of a dozen torpedoes. They were equipped with an array of five hydrophones in the bow to allow them to locate and engage targets while submerged.

Construction and career
HMS R1 was laid down at Chatham Dockyard on 4 February 1917 and launched on 25 April 1918 by Lady Sturdee. The boat was commissioned on 14 October 1918. She came too late to see any combat in World War I like most of the other R-class submarines. R1 was sold for scrap on 20 January 1923 to J. Smith.

Notes

References
 
 
 
 

 

British R-class submarines
Royal Navy ship names
1918 ships